Neil is a masculine name of Gaelic and Irish origin. The name is an anglicisation of the Irish Niall which is of disputed derivation. The Irish name may be derived from words meaning "cloud", "passionate", "victory", "honour" or "champion". As a surname, Neil is traced back to Niall of the Nine Hostages who was an Irish king and eponymous ancestor of the Uí Néill and MacNeil kindred. Most authorities cite the meaning of Neil in the context of a surname as meaning "champion".

Origins
The Gaelic name was adopted by the Vikings and taken to Iceland as Njáll (see Nigel). From Iceland it went via Norway, Denmark, and Normandy to England. The name also entered Northern England and Yorkshire directly from Ireland, and from Norwegian settlers. Neal or Neall is the Middle English form of Nigel.

As a first name, during the Middle Ages, the Gaelic name of Irish origins was popular in Ireland and later Scotland. During the 20th century Neil began to be used in England and North America, and grew in popularity throughout the English-speaking world; however, in England, it has recently been eclipsed by the Gaelic form.

The surname Neil is a reduced form of the surname McNeil (from the Gaelic Mac Néill, "son of Niall"), or variant form the surname of Neill (from the Irish Ó Néill and Mac Néill or the Scottish Gaelic Mac Néill, meaning "descendant of Niall" and "son of Niall".

The name passed from Ireland to Scotland where it had the Mc/Mac prefix a prefix that already existed in the Irish surname such as Lóegaire mac Néill. Some Scottish McNeill's returned to Ireland in the 14th century and are associated with MacNeill, MacGreal, MacReill, and Mag Reil surnames.

The Manx version of the name is Kneal (1598), Kneale (1655), or Kneel (1636). It evolved from McNelle (1408) and MacNeyll (1430) becoming Kneal by 1598.

Variants 

Variants of the given name include: Neale and Neal.

The table below sets out the various surnames derived from Niall and Nial

Notable people with the given name
Neil Abercrombie (born 1938), former Governor of Hawaii and U.S. Representative
Neil Anderson (cricketer) (born 1979), Irish cricketer, right-handed batsman and a left-arm spin bowler
Neil Armstrong (disambiguation), several people
Neil Bogart (1943–1982), American music executive
Neil Breen, American filmmaker and actor
Neil Brewer (born 1954), English musician and singer-songwriter
Neil Buchanan (born 1961), English television presenter, artist and musician
Neil Carmichael, Baron Carmichael of Kelvingrove (1921–2001), British Labour Party politician, MP in Glasgow 1962–1983
Neil Carmichael (English politician) (born 1961), English businessman and academic, MP for Stroud 2010–2017
Neil Cicierega (born 1986), American artist and Internet personality
Neil Clarke (disambiguation), several people, including those named Neil Clark
Neil Clark Warren (born 1934), American psychologist and theologian
Neil Codling (born 1973), English musician, member of the band Suede
Neil Cole (disambiguation), several people
Neil Diamond (born 1941), American singer-songwriter, musician, and actor
Neil Farrell Jr. (born 1998), American football player
Neil Fairbrother (born 1963), English cricketer
Neil Gaiman (born 1960), English author
Neil Gorsuch (born 1967), Associate justice of the Supreme Court of the United States
Neil Hannon (born 1970), Northern Irish singer-songwriter and musician
Neale Hanvey (born 1964), Scottish politician
Neil Patrick Harris (born 1973), American actor
Neil Harrison (disambiguation), several people
Neil Innes (1944–2019), English writer, comedian and musician, member of the Rutles, the Bonzo Dog Doo-Dah Band
Neil Jenkins (disambiguation), several people
Neil Jordan (born 1950), Irish film maker
Neil Kenlock (born 1950), Jamaican-born photographer
Neil Kinnock (born 1942), British politician, and former leader of the Labour Party
Neil Lennon (born 1971), Northern Irish football coach and former player 
Neil Lyndon (born 1946), British journalist and author
 Neil MacGregor (born 1946), British art historian
Neil Martin (disambiguation), several people
Neil McGregor (disambiguation), several people
Neil McVicar (politician), Canadian politician
Neil Nitin Mukesh (born 1982), Indian actor
Neil O'Brien (disambiguation), several people
Neil Patel (designer), Welsh-American production designer
Neil Patel (political advisor), American publisher and co-founder of The Daily Caller
Neil Peart (1952–2020), Canadian drummer and lyricist of the rock band Rush
Neil Perry (born 1957), Australian chef
 Neil Perry (cricketer) (born 1958), English cricketer
Neil Prakash (born 1991), Australian terrorist
Neil Reid (disambiguation), several people
Neil Sedaka (born 1939), American musician
Neil Simon (1927–2018), American playwright
Neil Tennant (born 1954), British singer-songwriter of Pet Shop Boys
Neil Turk (born 1987), English cricketer
Neil deGrasse Tyson (born 1958), American astrophysicist, author and science communicator
Neil Wagner (born 1986), South African-born New Zealand cricketer
Neil Walker (disambiguation), several people
Neil Young (disambiguation), several people

People with the surname
 Alex Neil (politician) (born 1951), Scottish politician
 Alexandra Neil (born 1955), American actress
 Andrew Neil (born 1949), Scottish journalist and broadcaster
 Chris Neil (born 1979), Canadian professional ice hockey player
 Chris Neal (disambiguation) (and variants), several people
 Dan Neil (American football) (born 1973), American football player
Dan Neil (journalist) (born 1960), automobile columnist for the Los Angeles Times
 Fred Neil (1936–2001), American singer and songwriter
 María Fernanda Neil (born 1982), Argentine actress and model 
 Sam Neill (born 1947), New Zealand actor
 Sara Neil (born 1960), Canadian cyclist
 Tom Neil (1920–2018), British fighter pilot
 Vince Neil (born 1961), singer for American metal band Mötley Crüe

Fictional characters
Neil "The Good Looking", from the Canadian animated series Class of the Titans
Neil the Boxtank engine, from The Railway Series books by Rev. W.V. Awdry
Neil Goldman, from the Family Guy animated comedy series
Neil Pye, from the British TV sitcom The Young Ones
 Neil, character from the game Coffee Talk

See also

 Niall, Gaelic form
 Neil (given name) 
Neila (given name) 
 Nigel, given name
 Neal, Kneale, MacNeil, McNeil, Neale, Neill, Nelson, O'Neill, Niel
List of Irish-language given names
List of Scottish Gaelic given names

References

English masculine given names
Gaelic-language surnames
Irish masculine given names
Scottish masculine given names